The qualification for the 2016 Men's Olympic Field hockey Tournament was held from September 2014 to October 2015. There were three qualification events, host country, continental championship, and 2014–15 FIH Hockey World League Semifinals respectively. Total twelve teams could participated in the 2016 Summer Olympics.

Qualification summary

Host country
Each of the continental champions receives a berth alongside the host Brazil, while another six spots will be decided in the 2014–2015 FIH Hockey World League. As the host nation, Brazil has guaranteed a quota places if it satisfies the following performance criteria set by FIH: the men's team should either obtain a world ranking equal to or better than thirtieth place by the end of 2014, or not finish lower than sixth at the 2015 Pan American Games.
 qualified by finishing the fourth in the 2015 Pan American Games

Continental Qualification Tournament

Africa

America

Asia

Europe

Oceania

2014–15 World League Semifinals

References

External links
Qualification process

 
Men
Qualification
Field hockey at the Summer Olympics – Men's qualification